The 2014 Dubai Duty Free Darts Masters was the second staging of the tournament organised by the Professional Darts Corporation. It was the first World Series of Darts event of 2014. The tournament featured the top six players according to the Order of Merit, plus two wildcards, competing in a knockout system. The tournament was held at the Dubai Tennis Centre in Dubai over 29–30 May 2014.

Michael van Gerwen was the defending champion and he retained his title by defeating Peter Wright 11–7 in the final.

Prize money
The total prize fund was £125,000.

Qualifiers
The top six players on the PDC Order of Merit after the 2014 World Championship qualified for the event, with the top 4 seeded. They were joined by two wildcards. These were:

  Michael van Gerwen (Winner)
  Phil Taylor (Quarter-finals)
  Simon Whitlock (Quarter-finals)
  Adrian Lewis (Semi-finals)
  Dave Chisnall (Semi-finals)
  James Wade (Quarter-finals)

Wildcards:
  Peter Wright (Runner-up)
  Raymond van Barneveld (Quarter-finals)

Draw

Statistics
{|class="wikitable sortable" style="font-size: 95%; text-align: right"
|-
! Player
! Eliminated
! Played
! Legs Won
! Legs Lost
! LWAT
! 100+
! 140+
! 180s
! 3-dart Average
|-
|align="left"|  Michael van Gerwen
| Winner
| 3
| 32
| 23
| 12
| 77
| 26
| 23
| 99.64
|-
|align="left"|  Peter Wright
| Runner-up
| 3
| 28
| 24
| 10
| 69
| 42
| 8
| 91.04
|-
|align="left"|  Adrian Lewis
| Semi-finals
| 2
| 17
| 16
| 6
| 35
| 22
| 10
| 94.96
|-
|align="left"|  Dave Chisnall
| Semi-finals
| 2
| 18
| 19
| 7
| 30
| 34
| 13
| 94.56
|-
|align="left"|  Simon Whitlock
| Quarter-finals
| 1
| 8
| 10
| 3
| 22
| 9
| 9
| 100.54
|-
|align="left"|  James Wade
| Quarter-finals
| 1
| 9
| 10
| 3
| 24
| 14
| 2
| 95.40
|-
|align="left"|  Raymond van Barneveld
| Quarter-finals
| 1
| 5
| 10
| 1
| 24
| 8
| 3
| 94.49
|-
|align="left"|  Phil Taylor
| Quarter-finals
| 1
| 5
| 10
| 2
| 17
| 5
| 3
| 91.72
|-

Broadcasting
The tournament was available in the following territories on these channels:

References

Dubai Duty Free Darts Masters
Dubai Duty Free Darts Masters
Dubai Duty Free Darts Masters
Dubai Duty Free Darts Masters
World Series of Darts